Serge Rubanraut (16 March 1948, in Shanghai – 12 October 2008, in Sydney) was an Australian chess master.

He won Australian Chess Championship at Sydney 1976, and represented Australia in the 22nd Chess Olympiad at Haifa 1976. 
He died at the age of 60 from a heart attack, and was buried in the Jewish section of Rookwood Cemetery, Sydney.

References

External links
Serge Rubanraut at 365Chess.com
26 chessgames at New in chess

1948 births
2008 deaths
Chinese Jews
Australian chess players
Jewish Australian sportspeople
Jewish chess players
Jewish Chinese history
Chess players from Shanghai
Chinese emigrants to Australia
People of Chinese-Jewish descent
Sportspeople from Sydney
20th-century chess players